General Ali Abdullah Ayyoub (born 28 April 1952 in Latakia) is the current Deputy Prime Minister of Syria, senior Syrian Arab Army officer and former Minister of Defense. He was appointed by Syrian President Bashar al-Assad on 1 January 2018.

General Ayyoub has a long experience in commanding manoeuvre formations and is also recognized as a specialist in land warfare.

Education

Military Education

 Bachelor in Military Sciences, Armoured Branch, Military Academy, Homs (1971–1973)
 Appointed with the rank of Lieutenant under probation (1973)
 Company Commander Course
 Battalion Commander Course
 Command and Staff Course
 Higher Staff Course (War Course)

Functions and main responsibilities

 Former commander of different Armoured Brigades of Syrian Land Forces and Syrian Republican Guard
 Former commander of the 4th Armoured Division
 Former commander of the First Army Corps (regrouping the 1st, 4th, 5th, and 7th Divisions), Damascus
 Former Chief of Staff of the Arab Syrian Arab Army between 12 July 2012 and 31 December 2017

References

1952 births
Living people
Syrian generals
Syrian ministers of defense
Chiefs of Staff of the Syrian Army
People from Latakia Governorate
Arab Socialist Ba'ath Party – Syria Region politicians
Frunze Military Academy alumni
Deputy Prime Ministers of Syria
Homs Military Academy alumni